Amphigerontia contaminata is a species of Psocoptera from Psocidae family that can be found in England, and sometimes Ireland. They are also common in countries like Austria, Belgium, Canary Islands, Cyprus, Finland, France, Germany, Greece, Hungary, Italy, Latvia, Luxembourg, Norway, Poland, Romania, Spain, Switzerland, and the Netherlands. The species are either light black or brown coloured.

Habitat
Feeds on all trees including apple, birch, elder, hawthorn, hazel, oak and sea buckthorn.

References

Psocidae
Insects described in 1836
Psocoptera of Europe